David Ducourtioux (born 11 April 1978) is a French former professional footballer who played as a defender. He is currently a part of Lille OSC' academy staff.

Career

Coaching career
After working a few years for Union Nationale des Footballeurs Professionels, better known as just UNFP, Ducourtioux joined RC Strasbourg Alsace as assistant coach of Thierry Laurey. He left the position in May 2020. Two days later, he was appointed manager of Gazélec Ajaccio. He left the club at the end of May 2022.

In July 2022, Ducourtioux joined Lille OSC's academy as a coordinator and assistant to the center’s general manager, Jean-Michel Vandamme.

References

External links

1978 births
Living people
French footballers
Association football defenders
Ligue 1 players
Ligue 2 players
Toulouse FC players
SC Bastia players
Stade de Reims players
CS Sedan Ardennes players
Valenciennes FC players
Gazélec Ajaccio players
French football managers
Gazélec Ajaccio managers